Pablo Aranda Ruiz (26 April 1968 – 1 August 2020) was a Spanish writer.

He was born in Málaga and studied Spanish philology at university. A tireless traveller, he worked in a number of professions, including teaching at a juvenile correctional facility and teaching Spanish at the University of Oran in Algeria.

His first novel La otra ciudad was published in 2003. It won the Premio de la Crítica Andaluza for best first novel and was also nominated for the Premio Primavera. His other works include Desprendimiento de rutina (Arguval, 2003) which won the Premio Diario Sur para Novela Corta and Ucrania (Destino, 2006) which won the Premio Málaga.

In 2012, he made his first foray into children’s literature, with his book Fede quiere ser pirata (Anaya, 2012) which won the Premio de Literatura Infantil Ciudad de Málaga. He followed up with a sequel El colegio más raro del mundo (Anaya, 2014). His last work was the novel El protegido (Malpaso, 2015).

Selected works
 El protegido
 Los soldados
 Ucrania
 El orden improbable
 La otra ciudad
 Desprendimiento de rutina

References

Spanish male novelists
1968 births
2020 deaths
Spanish children's writers
21st-century Spanish novelists
21st-century Spanish male writers
People from Málaga